Grenada participated in the 2010 Summer Youth Olympics in Singapore.

The Grenada team consisted of 6 athletes competing in 3 sports: athletics, boxing and swimming.

Athletics

Boys
Field Events

Girls
Track and Road Events

Boxing

Boys

Swimming

References

External links
Competitors List: Grenada

Nations at the 2010 Summer Youth Olympics
2010 in Grenadian sport
Grenada at the Youth Olympics